Good Witch is an American / Canadian fantasy comedy-drama television series, based on the made-for-TV movie series of the same name, that aired on the Hallmark Channel. The series centered around the spirited life of Cassie Nightingale (Catherine Bell), her teenage daughter Grace (Bailee Madison) and their neighbors, the Radfords – Sam (James Denton) and his teenage son, Nick (Rhys Matthew Bond), as well as the various residents of Middleton USA, some of whom believed Cassie is a witch.

The series premiered on February 28, 2015, and was renewed for seven consecutive seasons. On July 9, 2021, it was announced that the seventh season would be the series' last. 
The series is available to watch on netflix (with 5 seasons), Vudu, Amazon instant video, Google Play and Hallmark channel.

Series overview

Episodes

Season 1 (2015)

Special (2015)

Season 2 (2016)

Special (2016)

Season 3 (2017)

Special (2017)

Season 4 (2018)

Special (2018)

Season 5 (2019)

Special (2019)

Season 6 (2020)

Season 7 (2021)

Home video releases

Box sets

References

External links

The Good Witch
Lists of American fantasy television series episodes